Chinameca (also known as El Pacayal) is a stratovolcano in central-eastern El Salvador. It lies north of San Miguel volcano and rises over the town of Chinameca. Fumaroles can be found on the north side, and it has been the site of a geothermal exploration program.

See also
List of volcanoes in El Salvador

References 

Mountains of El Salvador
Volcanoes of El Salvador
Stratovolcanoes of El Salvador
Calderas of Central America